Jitpurphedi is a village and former Village Development Committee that is now part of  Tarakeshwar Municipality in Kathmandu District in Province No. 3 of central Nepal. At the time of the 1991 Nepal census it had a population of 5,135 and had 1,103 households in it.

It is exactly located on northern part of Kathmandu, below Tarkeshwor Temple (One of the Hindu temple).

References

Populated places in Kathmandu District